Chaudhary Khurshid Ahmed (20 June 1934 – 17 February 2020) was a practicing lawyer before the Supreme Court of India and a politician who served as the Member of Parliament from Faridabad, Haryana. He was elected as MLA to the Punjab and Haryana assembly five times, and also represented the Faridabad constituency as a member of parliament.

Early life 
Khurshid Ahmed was born to Chaudhary Kabir Ahmed and Faizan Begum. After independence, his father was twice elected to Haryana assembly.

Personal life 
Khurshid Ahmed married Firdos Begum in 1961. He had three sons and one daughter – Aftab Ahmed,  Mehtab Ahmed, Anjum Ahmed and Rukhsana. Aftab Ahmed was elected as MLA from Nuh, Mewat on the ticket of Congress Party and was an ex-Cabinet minister of Haryana. He was Vice-President of Haryana Pradesh Congress Committee. Mehtab Ahmed is practicing lawyer, while youngest son Anjum Ahmed is Practicing lawyer in High Court of Punjab & Haryana.

Political career 

He was elected to the state assembly five times and twice represented the Faridabad constituency Lok Sabha as well.

He also served the party at different levels:

References

Indian National Congress politicians from Haryana
1934 births
2020 deaths
Haryana MLAs 1966–1967
Haryana MLAs 1968–1972
Haryana MLAs 1977–1982
Haryana MLAs 1987–1991
Haryana MLAs 1996–2000
Lok Sabha members from Haryana
Supreme Court of India lawyers
People from Faridabad